The Thomson River, a perennial river of the West Gippsland catchment, is located in the Gippsland region of the Australian state of Victoria.

Location and features
The Thomson River rises below Newlands at the north western end of the Baw Baw Plateau of the Great Dividing Range, where it shares a watershed with the Yarra and Tanjil rivers. From its source, the river flows generally north, then east, then south southeast through its impoundment, then southeast, then east, and finally east by south, joined by seventeen tributaries including the Jordan, Aberfeldy, and Macalister rivers, before reaching its confluence with the Latrobe River near Sale. The river descends  over its  course.

The Thomson Valley was intensively mined for gold during the latter half of the 19th and early 20th centuries. Prospector "Ned" Stringer discovered significant quantities of alluvial gold at the junction of what is now known as Stringers Creek. A short distance up that creek the gold mining township of Walhalla was established. The first person to walk the entire length of the river was Ronald Le Sage, father of David Le Sage, who explored its viability for a cattle droving route in 1959. 

The river is impounded not far below its source by the Thomson Dam, creating Thomson Reservoir. The reservoir provides around 70% of Melbourne's water storage and supplies about 30% of Melbourne's water needs. This takes about 50% of the river's natural flow, which places a great environmental stress downstream. It particularly affects the Gippsland Lakes, which include Lake Wellington, Lake Victoria and Lake King. This area has international significance as a Ramsar listed wetland site.

Diversion tunnel

Tunnelling commenced in August 1911 and was completed around October 1912; making the diversion tunnel one of thirteen river diversions surviving from the Victorian gold rush.

Etymology

The river was given its English name in 1840 by Angus McMillan in honour of Sir Edward Thomson, the Chief Secretary of the Colony of New South Wales, based in Sydney.

See also

 Rivers of Victoria

References

External links
  
 

West Gippsland catchment
Rivers of Gippsland (region)
Ramsar sites in Australia